This is a list of sloops of war  of the United States Navy.

Sailing sloops of war 

, scuttled 3 September 1814 to prevent capture
, lost after 28–29 September 1854 with approx. 197 aboard
, captured 14 December 1814

, wrecked 15 November 1846, no fatalities
, wrecked 27 May 1863
, wrecked 2 November 1842, 3 killed

, lost in July or August 1815 with 134 aboard

, burned to prevent capture November 1777
, captured 20 April 1814
, wrecked 27 May 1863

, scuttled 20 April 1861

, foundered 8 August 1813, 42 killed
, captured 27 April 1777

, foundered with the loss of all hands 10 September 1829
, wrecked 24 April 1778

, lost with all hands after 18 September 1860

 USS Ohio (1812), captured 12 August 1814

, wrecked 17–19 July 1841, no fatalities

, burned and exploded 27 April 1863
, captured 1814
, destroyed to prevent capture 14 August 1779

, foundered 8 August 1813, 42 killed

, captured October 1813

, captured 15 October 1812

, lost with all hands October 1814
, wrecked 6 September 1850, no fatalities

Steam sloops of war

Marion class

Saranac class
, wrecked 18 June 1875, no fatalities

Wyoming class

Dacotah class

Seminole class

Saginaw class
, wrecked 29 October 1870 at Kure Atoll, 4 later killed while sailing for help

Pocahontas class

Hartford class

Mohican class
, wrecked 2 February 1894, no fatalities

, sunk in collision 24 January 1870, 125 killed

Contoocook class
 renamed USS Albany
USS Manitou (1866) renamed USS Worcester
USS Mosholu (1867) renamed USS Severn
USS Pushmataha renamed USS Cambridge and 
 (not launched)

Java class

Ossipee class

, wrecked 23 August 1862, no fatalities

, sunk by submarine 17 February 1864, 5 killed

Sacramento class

, wrecked 19 June 1867, no fatalities

Ticonderoga class

Alaska class

 formerly USS Algoma
 formerly USS Kenosha
 formerly USS Astoria

Swatara class

 (1867)

Galena class

Vandalia class
, wrecked 16 March 1889, 43 killed

Adams class

 (As rebuilt 1879)
, later classified as IX-10

Alert class
 (1875), later classified as AS-4
, wrecked 24 November 1877, 98 killed
USS Ranger (1876), later classified as PG-23, IX-18

References
Chapelle, Howard Irving. The History of the American Sailing Navy; The Ships and Their Development. New York: Norton, 1949.
Canney, Donald L. The Old Steam Navy. Annapolis, Md: Naval Institute Press, 1990.  

Sloops of war
Sloops of war list